The Afghanistan national cricket team visited Pakistan from 6 to 13 February 2013 and played a series of limited-overs matches  against the Pakistan A team and some regional sides. They played five one-dayers and a Twenty20 at three venues around the country. All matches were broadcast live on GEO Super television.

List A Tour Matches

Hyderabad and Karachi v Afghanistan

Match Report

Bahawalpur and Multan v Afghanistan

Match Report

Faisalabad and Rawalpindi v Afghanistan

List A Series

1st One Day

Match Report

2nd One Day

T20 series

Only T20

Broadcasters
GEO Super - PAKISTAN
Sports 3 - AFGHANISTAN

References

External links
 ESPNcricinfo
 CricketArchive

2013 in Afghan cricket
2013 in Pakistani cricket
2013
International cricket competitions in 2013
Pakistani cricket seasons from 2000–01